Sukhochak is a small town in Punjab, Pakistan near the India/Pakistan border.

Villages in Punjab, Pakistan